María Dolores Leonor "Mariló" Montero Abárzuza (born 28 July 1965), is a Spanish journalist and television presenter. She was a presenter of La mañana de La 1 of TVE from 2009 to 2016.

References

1965 births
Living people
People from Estella Oriental
Spanish women journalists
Spanish television personalities
Spanish television presenters
Spanish women television presenters